Crazy Honey Bunny is the first mini-album and second ever release from the Japanese punk rock band 54 Nude Honeys, released on October 1, 1995, by Epic Sony/dohb Discs.

Track listing

References

1995 EPs
54 Nude Honeys albums